Sacrilege is a double remix album by the band Can, released in 1997. It features remixes of many of the band's best-known songs from the 1960s and 1970s, remixed by contemporary recording artists.

The remix of "Spoon" by Sonic Youth was sampled by Tyler, The Creator for the song "Foreword" on his 4th album, Flower Boy.

Track listing
 "PNOOM" (Moon Up Mix) by Brian Eno – 0:56
 "Spoon" (Sonic Youth Mix) – 6:08
 "Blue Bag (Inside Paper)" (Toroid Mix) by François Kevorkian & Rob Rives – 6:54
 "Tango Whiskyman" (A Guy Called Gerald Mix) – 5:12
 "TV Spot" (Bruce Gilbert Mix) – 3:52
 "Vitamin C" (U.N.K.L.E. Mix) – 8:20
 "Halleluhwah" (Halleluwa Orbus 2) – 9:20
 "Oh Yeah" (Sunroof Mix) – 8:56
 "Unfinished" (Hiller/Kaiser/Leda Mix) – 6:01
 "Future Days" (Blade Runner Mix) by Carl Craig – 6:08
 "... And More" (Westbam Mix) – 6:41
 "Father Cannot Yell" (Pete Shelley/Black Radio Mix) – 8:28
 "Dizzy Spoon" (System 7 Mix) – 6:45
 "Yoo Doo Right" (3P Mix) – 4:13
 "Flow Motion" (Air Liquide Mix) – 6:15
 "Oh Yeah" (Secret Knowledge Mix) – 9:01

References

Can (band) albums
1997 remix albums